Demba Barry (born November 4, 1987 in Bamako) is a Malian footballer. He currently plays as a defender for the Algerian Championnat National club ES Sétif. He scored his first goal for Al-Hilal in a match which Al-Hilal beat Al-Ahli, Wad Medani 2–1 and in the CAF Champions League he scored against Al-Merreikh SC in a match which finished 3–1. He scored 2 goals against El-Merriekh in the last 6 meetings between them

Barry was an important part of JS Kabylie's defense, playing in 2008 CAF Confederation Cup group stage.

Club career
 2006-2007 AS Real Bamako (Mali)
 2007-2009 JS Kabylie (Algeria)
 2009–2012 Al-Hilal Omdurman (Sudan)
 2012–Present ES Sétif (Algeria)

References

Honours
 Won the Algerian League once with JS Kabylie in 2008
 Won the Sudan Premier League twice with Al-Hilal in 2009 and 2010

External links

 JS Kabylie Profile
 DZFoot Profile
 

1987 births
Malian footballers
Living people
Association football defenders
AS Real Bamako players
JS Kabylie players
ES Sétif players
Expatriate footballers in Algeria
Expatriate footballers in Sudan
Malian expatriate sportspeople in Algeria
Malian expatriate sportspeople in Sudan
Sportspeople from Bamako
Al-Hilal Club (Omdurman) players
21st-century Malian people